The pygmy shiner (Notropis tropicus) is a species of cyprinid fish. It is endemic to the Pánuco River basin in east–central Mexico. Its type locality is Tamesí River at Llera in the Tamaulipas state.

References 

Notropis
Freshwater fish of Mexico
Endemic fish of Mexico
Fish described in 1975
Pánuco River